Johann Beck may refer to:
 Johann Nepomuk Beck (1827–1904), Hungarian operatic baritone
 Johann Heinrich Beck (1856–1924), American composer and conductor
 Johann Georg Beck (1676–1722), German engraver
 Johann Tobias Beck (1804–1878), German theologian